Harriet Butler (died 1935) was an American tennis player of the end of the 19th century. 

Notably, she won the US Women's National Championship in 1893 in women's doubles with Aline Terry. 

She was married to General Jay Johnson Morrow.

Grand Slam finals

Doubles (1 title)

References 

Date of birth unknown
Date of death unknown
Year of birth missing
American female tennis players
United States National champions (tennis)
Place of birth missing
Grand Slam (tennis) champions in women's doubles
1935 deaths